Mar Mar Khaing (also spelt Mar Mar Khine; born 20 April 1961) is a Burmese politician and lawyer who currently serves as a member of parliament in the House of Representatives for Thaton Township. In the 2015 Myanmar general election, she contested the Thaton Township constituency for a seat in the Pyithu Hluttaw MP, the country's lower house.

Early life and career
Mar Mar Khaing was on born 20 April 1961 in Thaton, Mon State, Myanmar. She is an ethnic Pa-O. She attended at Basic Education High School No. 2 Thaton and graduated with Law from Mawlamyine University of Distance Education.

In 1980 to 1985, she had worked at Thaton Construction Corporation. In 1989, she had worked Senior lawyer and became lawyer of the Supreme Court of Myanmar in 1999. In the 2015 Myanmar general election, she contested the Thaton Township constituency winning a majority of 48,283 (53% of the votes), won a Pyithu Hluttaw seat.

External links 
 Pyidaungsu Hluttaw: Mar Mar Khaing's MP Profile

References

National League for Democracy politicians
Members of Pyithu Hluttaw
1961 births
Living people
21st-century Burmese women politicians
21st-century Burmese politicians
People from Mon State